Sekolah Menengah Sains Sultan Mohamad Jiwa (English: Sultan Mohamad Jiwa Science School; abbreviated SMSSMJ) is a public boarding school, Sekolah Berasrama Penuh in Sungai Petani, Kedah, Malaysia. It was named after the nineteenth reigning Sultan of Kedah, Almarhum Kebawah Duli Yang Maha Mulia Sultan Mohamad Jiwa Zainal Adilin II.

History 
SMSSMJ was established in 1973 under the Second Malaysia Plan as Sekolah Menengah Sains Kedah. The school officiation took place on 6 November 1976. In 1984, the school is being renamed as Sekolah Sultan Mohamad Jiwa. The inauguration of the new name was made by Kebawah Duli Yang Maha Mulia Sultan Abdul Halim Mu'adzam Shah ibni Almarhum Sultan Badlishah, the Sultan of Kedah.

This name was subsequently changed to Sekolah Menengah Sains Sultan Mohamad Jiwa in 1997 and remains so now. Students of the first batch was placed temporarily in several other schools in Perak, SMK Anderson and SMJK Methodist Girls School and in Kedah, SMK Khir Johari, Sungai Petani during the construction of the school building.

Opening 
In 1974, after building and school complex was completed and certified safe to occupy the school start to commence it operation with a total of 35 number of teachers, 60 support staff and 454 pupils.

Sport House 
All the students of this school is assign to one of the four sport houses at the moment of their inception to the school. Every of this sport house each were named after four key office within classical Malay kingdoms as Bendahara, Laksamana, Panglima and Temenggung.

Throughout the school year, each house will be competing in sports activities, whether academic, sports, dedication and many more through collection of Merit Demerit Sport House System. At its peak, the highest collecting point in the system will be proclaimed winner of the Sport House System in a formal dinner party finale at the end of the school year.

Principals

Yearbook 
SMSSMJ has published its own annual magazine, named RINTISAINS. The magazine is published by full color printing and record captured special moment around the year and also a formal picture of each classroom members and each of its graduating student.

Alumni Association 
Alumni body of the school is known as ASSAK (Alumni Science Kedah). The alumni is established by the former student and in recent year, the membership is automatically conferred upon graduation.

Notable alumni 
 Wan Mohammad Khair-il Anuar, politician, architect, and entrepreneur

References

External links